Sri Venkateswara University (commonly referred as S. V. University or SVU) is a public state university located in Tirupati in Andhra Pradesh, India. The university is named after Lord Venkateswara, whose shrine is located in the city.

The university was founded in 1954 by the then Chief minister of Andhra Pradesh, Tanguturi Prakasam Pantulu and Siram Govindarajulu Naidu as its founder vice-chancellor. The university campus covers a large area on land leased by Tirumala Tirupati Devasthanams. It is located on the West side of Tirupati, surrounded by the other universities in the city, namely Sri Padmavati Mahila Visvavidyalayam, Sri Venkateswara Veterinary University, Sri Venkateswara Vedic University, Sri Venkateswara Institute of Medical Sciences and National Sanskrit University.

Affiliated colleges
Colleges that are affiliated belong to Chittoor district and Tirupati district.

College of Sciences

College of Engineering
Sri Venkateswara University College of Engineering is an autonomous institution whose foundation was laid by the late Pandit Jawaharlal Nehru, the first prime minister of India, on 13 October 1959.

Department of Physics 

The Department of Physics hosts one of the four national research facilities: a center for research using the MST Radar Facility at Gadanki, commissioned under the UGC.

Rankings
 
Sri Venkateswara University was ranked 801–1000 in the world by the Times Higher Education World University Rankings of 2020 and 201–250 in Asia. The QS World University Rankings of 2020 ranked it 248 in Asia. The university was ranked 68th overall in India by the National Institutional Ranking Framework in 2020, 38th among universities and 153rd in the engineering ranking.

Notable alumni 

 Muzaffar Ali, vice chancellor of Dr. Abdul Haq Urdu University in Kurnool
 Ramachandra Naidu Galla, industrialist and founder of Amara Raja Group
 Galla Ramachandra Naidu, former chairman of Canara Bank
 N. Chandrababu Naidu, former chief minister of Andhra Pradesh and president of Telugu Desam Party
 Raj & DK, filmmaking duo
 Kotla Vijaya Bhaskara Reddy, former chief minister of Andhra Pradesh and union cabinet minister
 Prem Reddy, cardiologist and a major owner of Prime Healthcare Services
 Ranganath, Telugu language actor
 Vakkantham Vamsi, dialogue writer, screenwriter, and director in Telugu cinema

References

External links

 
Universities and colleges in Tirupati
Universities in Andhra Pradesh
Educational institutions established in 1954
1954 establishments in Andhra Pradesh